So Far So Good may refer to:

 So Far So Good (film), 2014
 So Far So Good (Bryan Adams album), 1993
 So Far So Good (John Martyn album), 1977
 So Far So Good (The Chainsmokers album), 2022
 So Far So Good (video), a 2001 DVD by Atomic Kitten
 "So Far So Good" (Thornley song), 2004
 So Far So Good, a 2011 album by Tito Jackson
 "So Far So Good", a song by Bryan Adams from Anthology
 "So Far So Good", a song by Sheena Easton from the soundtrack of the 1986 film About Last Night...
 "So Far So Good", a song by Slade from Slade in Flame
 "So Far So Good", a 1994 autobiography by Burgess Meredith
 "So Far So Good", a song by Andy Breckman on the album Proud Dad
 So Far So Good, a French company that developed the game Incredibox

See also
So Far, So Good... So What!, an album by Megadeth